Maximilian Mayer (born 21 July 1998) is an Austrian football player. He plays for FC Mannsdorf-Großenzersdorf.

Club career
He made his Austrian Football First League debut for FC Liefering on 4 March 2016 in a game against Kapfenberger SV.

He won the 2016–17 UEFA Youth League with the Under-19 squad of FC Red Bull Salzburg.

References

External links
 

1998 births
Living people
Austrian footballers
Austria youth international footballers
FC Liefering players
TSV Hartberg players
Floridsdorfer AC players
Austrian Regionalliga players
2. Liga (Austria) players
Association football defenders